Tajuria albiplaga, the pallid royal , is a species of lycaenid or blue butterfly found in the Indomalayan realm.

Subspecies
T. a. albiplaga Sikkim, Assam
T. a. pallescens  Druce, [1903]  Assam, Burma, Thailand
T. a. alixae  Eliot, 1973  Peninsular Malaya
T. a. tura  de Nicéville, 1895  Java, Sumatra

References

Tajuria
Butterflies described in 1887